Rhodanine is a 5-membered heterocyclic organic compound possessing a thiazolidine core. It was discovered in 1877 by Marceli Nencki who named it "Rhodaninsaure" in reference to its synthesis from ammonium rhodanide (known as ammonium thiocyanate to modern chemists) and chloroacetic acid in water.

Rhodanines can also be prepared by the reaction of carbon disulfide, ammonia, and chloroacetic acid, which proceeds via an intermediate dithiocarbamate.

Derivatives
Some rhodanine derivatives have pharmacological properties; for instance, epalrestat is used to treat diabetic neuropathy.  However, most are promiscuous binders with poor selectivity; as a result, this class of compounds is viewed with suspicion by medicinal chemists. Differing academic opinions exist concerning the correct use of PAINS filters, the necessity of the experimental confirmations of such properties, and many useful features of rhodanine derivatives.

References

Thiazolidines
Lactams